Tobacco industry in Pakistan is a major employment provider in farming, manufacturing, distribution, and retail in Pakistan. Most of the agricultural cultivation is based in Charsadda District, Mardan District, Nowshera District, and Swabi District of Khyber Pakhtunkhwa. 

Tobacco is grown on 0.25 percent of irrigated land in Pakistan. As of 2016, 34,000 hectares were under cultivation which fell from 43,000 hectares a few years ago. 

Around 60 percent of market share is held by Pakistan Tobacco Company and Philip Morris Pakistan.

Companies
 Pakistan Tobacco Company
 Philip Morris Pakistan

References

Industries of Pakistan
Pakistan
Tobacco in Pakistan
Economy of Khyber Pakhtunkhwa